The climate and ecology of land immediately surrounding the Mediterranean Sea is influenced by several factors. Overall, the land has a Mediterranean climate, with mild, rainy winters and hot, dry summers. The climate induces characteristic Mediterranean forests, woodlands, and scrub vegetation. Plant life immediately near the Mediterranean is in the Mediterranean Floristic region, while mountainous areas further from the sea supports the Sub-Mediterranean Floristic province.

An important factor in the local climate and ecology of the lands in the Mediterranean basin is the elevation: an increase of elevation by  causes the average air temperature to drop by 5 C/ 9 F and decreases the amount of water that can be held by the atmosphere by 30%. This decrease in temperature and increase in rainfall result in altitudinal zonation, where the land can be divided into life zones of similar climate and ecology, depending on elevation.

Mediterranean vegetation shows a variety of ecological adaptations to hot and dry summer conditions. As Mediterranean vegetation differ both in species and composition from temperate vegetation, ecologists use special terminology for the Mediterranean altitudinal zonation: 
 Eu-mediterranean belt: 20- 16 °C (avg annual temperature)
 Sub-mediterranean belt: 15- 12 °C
 Hilly region: 11- 8 °C
 Mountainous belt: 7- 4 °C
 Alpine belt: 3- 0 °C
 Subnival belt: 0- minus 4 °C 

Even within the Mediterranean Basin, differences in aridity alter the life zones as a function of elevation. For example, the wetter Maritime and Dinaric Alps have a North-Mediterranean zonation pattern, while the southern Apennine Mountains and the Spanish Sierra Nevada have a moderate Eu-Mediterranean zonation pattern. Finally, the drier Atlas Mountains of Africa and Taurus Mountains of the Near East have a Xero-Mediterranean pattern.

Examples of each of these altitudinal zonation patterns is described below, by examining the climate and ecology of several locations around the Mediterranean Basin.

Dinaric Alps of the Balkan Peninsula

An example of the wetter (or maritime) pattern comes from the Orjen range in the southeastern coastal Dinaric ranges of Montenegro and Bosnia-Herzegovina.

Above  of elevation, the Orjen range lies in the Dinaric Mountains mixed forests ecoregion (as defined by the World Wildlife Fund). This ecoregion is known for its humidity, compared to other mountain ranges of the Mediterranean. Life zones in the Orjen range, with corresponding elevation ranges and indicator species are:
 Eu-mediterranean (lower subtropical belt, ME=meridional) , Holm Oak (Quercus ilex), Kermes Oak (Quercus coccifera), Olive tree (Olea europaea). More humid habitats show Bay Laurel (Laurus nobilis) and Oleander (Nerium oleander) formations.
 Supra-mediterranean (upper subtropical belt) , Macedonian Oak (Quercus trojana) and Oriental Hornbeam (Carpinus orientalis); above Turkey Oak (Quercus cerris) and Hungarian Oak or Italian Oak (Quercus frainetto). With more humidity: Forests of Sweet Chestnut (Castanea sativa), Downy Oak or Pubescent Oak (Quercus pubescens) and European Hophornbeam (Ostrya carpinifolia Scop.).
 Oro-mediterranean (temperate zone, NE= Nemoral) , Forest of Common Beech (Fagus sylvatica) over calcareous soil. Dinaric calcareous block fir forest; European Silver Fir (Abies alba).
The less humid regions have Juniper (and for example: Iris orjenii, Viola chelmea) over Sesleria robusta grasses.
Trifolium, Narcissus, Gentiana nivalis, Draba hoppeanae, Androsace alpina.

Climate
Examples of climate near the Orjen range include eu-mediterranean at the Podgorica Airport:

and Crkvice in the supra-mediterranean belt:

Note how the mean temperature near sea level is comparable to the high temperature at Crkvice, 940 meters higher.

Sierra Nevada of Spain
The Sierra Nevada of central Spain is an example of eu-mediterranean zonation arising from moderate aridity. The Sierra Nevada lie in the Iberian conifer forests ecoregion, which contain conifers above  elevation, with mixed oak woodland below. The base of the mountains have a continental Mediterranean climate, which gets progressively cooler as the elevation increases:
 Thermomediterranean zone (Lowland); under  elevation. Summers are hot here and winters almost nonexistent. This zone is mostly used for agriculture, but studies say Mastic (Pistacia lentiscus), Common Juniper (Juniperus communis), (Aristolochia baetica) and Mediterranean Smilax or Common Smilax (Smilax aspera) would normally grow here. Rosemary (Rosmarinus officinalis), Purret (Ulex parviflorus) and Gum Rockrose (Cistus ladanifer) are present on poor soils or after forest fires.
 Mesomediterranean zone (Submontane)  elevation. The summers are here still hot but frosts are normal in the winters. In this zone Mastic (Pistacia lentiscus), wild Olive (Olea europaea) and Mediterranean Smilax or Common Smilax (Smilax aspera) grow. Poor sandy soils have few species with the Holm Oak (Quercus ilex), the Common Junipers, (Juniperus communis), Daphne gnidium and Etruscan honeysuckle (Lonicera etrusca).
 Supramediterranean zone (Mid-Montane)  elevation. The summers are here temperate and frosts and snow are frequent in winter. Quercus pyrenaica predominates, Portuguese Oak (Quercus faginea) and maple appear too; these three species make up the forest. More frequent are the Sessile Oaks (Quercus petraea) between 1,300 and 1,750 m. The Sessile Oaks are dominated by the Holm Oaks (Quercus ilex) and, depending on soil and altitude, by bushes as Common Juniper (Juniperus oxycedrus), barberry (Berberis hispanica), (Daphne gnidium), Butcher's broom (Ruscus aculeatus) and Common Hawthorn (Crataegus monogyna) over basic soils.
 Oromediterranean zone (Subalpine)  elevation. In this zone, coniferous plants and sparse Juniperus thurifera appear. The vegetation is composed by trees and bushes (Scots Pine (Pinus sylvestris), Savin Juniper (Juniperus sabina), Juniperus communis subsp. hemisphaerica, Prunus ramburii) and other bushes (Vella spinosa, Erinacea anthyllis, Bupleurum spinosum). On better soils the Common Juniper, Juniperus communis and Cytisus appears, forming communities with Arenaria imbricata, Festuca indigesta. The endemic flora is present too: Genista versicolor, Arenaria pungens, Potentilla nevadensis.
 Cryo-oromediterranean zone (Alpine);  elevation. Ligneous plants can not grow here because of the seasonal dryness typical of the Mediterranean climate and the presence of snow for more than 8 months. The vegetation has similarities to the Arctic tundra, with the Mat-grass (Nardus stricta) as the most common species.

Climate 
Almería, near sea level, is an example of a continental Mediterranean climate:

Prado Llano, in the Albergue Juvenil of Cordoba has an oromediterranean climate because it is approximately  higher:

Corsica 
The mountains of Corsica are in the Corsican montane broadleaf and mixed forests ecoregion, with a pattern of forest zones that are strongly dependent on altitude (due to the increase in moisture):
 Thermomediterranean vegetation belt,  (south) and (north); Pistacia lentiscus shrubs and dense mediterranean coastal scrub (maquis) with Quercus ilex, Phillyrea, Myrtus communis and wild olive (Olea europea var. sylvestris).

Forests include Quercus suber, Pinus pinaster, Quercus pubescens and Castanea sativa too.
Quercus ilex, Quercus pubescens, Pinus pinaster, Castanea sativa and Erica arborea not present anymore.
 Alpine vegetation belt, above ; sparse vegetation.
 Indicator plants: Rock Speedwell (Veronica fruticans), Potentilla crassinervia, Armeria pusilla, Cerastium thomasii, Phyteuma serratum, Stachys corsica  e Helichrysum frigidum.

Climate

See also

 Köppen climate classification
 Altitudinal zonation
 Biome
 List of terrestrial ecoregions (WWF)

Literature 

Environment of the Mediterranean
Ecoregions of Europe
Montane ecology